Pecopteris  is a very common form genus of leaves. Most Pecopteris leaves and fronds are associated with the marattialean tree fern Psaronius. However, Pecopteris-type foliage also is  borne on several filicalean ferns, and at least one seed fern. 
 Pecopteris first appeared in the Devonian period, but flourished in the Carboniferous, especially the Pennsylvanian. Plants bearing these leaves became extinct in the Permian period, due to swamps disappearing and temperatures on Earth dropping.

Etymology 
 
Pecopteris is derived from the Greek pekin, (to comb), and pteris, (a fern). This is because the leaflets of Pecopteris fronds are arranged like the teeth on a comb.

Species
As of 1997, there have been 250-300 species assigned to Pecopteris.

In Brazil, fossil of form genus Pecopteris was located in outcrop Morro Papalé in the city of Mariana Pimentel. They are in the geopark Paleorrota in Rio Bonito Formation and date from Sakmarian in Permian.

References

External links 

Prehistoric plant genera
Fossils of Georgia (U.S. state)
Paleozoic life of New Brunswick
Paleozoic life of Nova Scotia
Paleozoic life of Prince Edward Island
Prehistoric plants of North America